Sahyadri Tiger Reserve is a reserve in the state of Maharashtra, created by the Indian government in 2008. Located in the Sahyadri Ranges of the Western Ghats of Maharashtra, it is part of the ecoregions of North Western Ghats moist deciduous forests  and North Western Ghats montane rain forests. These ranges form a common boundary between Maharashtra, Karnataka and Goa, and constitute rich evergreen, semi-evergreen and moist deciduous forests. The area is spread over the four districts of Satara (Mahabaleshwar, Medha, Satara and Patan tahasils), Sangli (Shirala tahasil), Kolhapur (Shauwadi tahasil) and Ratnagiri (Sangameshwar, Chiplun and Khed tahasils).

Area
The reserve spreads over Koyna Wildlife Sanctuary forming the northern portion and Chandoli National Park forming the southern part of the reserve. Recently reserve is extended towards Radhanagari Wildlife Sanctuary.

The total area of the tiger reserve is:
 Core Area: 
 Buffer Area: 
 Total Area:

Fauna
The reserve is dedicated to the conservation of the Bengal tiger. On 23 and 24 May 2018, a tiger was photographed in a camera trap in Chandoli, the first direct evidence of tigers in the reserve in eight years. Prior to that, in 2014, scat DNA and model-based predictions were used to estimate that the reserve had 5–8 tigers. Other animals their include the leopard.

See also

 Tiger poaching in India
 Tiger reserves of India
 Vashishti River
 Wildlife of India

References

Wildlife sanctuaries in Maharashtra
Tiger reserves of India
2008 establishments in Maharashtra
Protected areas established in 2008